Deterrence Dispensed or DetDisp is an online group that promotes and distributes open-source 3D printed firearms, gun parts, and handloaded cartridges. The group strongly supports freedom of speech applied to computer code and blueprints, as well as the copyleft movement.

The group is best known for developing and releasing the FGC-9, a semi-automatic 3D-printed carbine requiring no regulated parts. Despite being recognized as a threat by various law enforcement agencies, no specific legal challenges have been launched against the organization as of August 2020 owing to the group's anonymous and decentralized nature.

History 
Deterrence Dispensed is a loose group of 3D-printed gun advocates. Among members of the group are an American who goes by the pseudonym "Ivan the Troll", and a Kurd "JStark1809". In February 2019, the group chose the name "Deterrence Dispensed" as a reference to the 3D printed firearms group Defense Distributed. The group says it has thousands of members, many of whom are in jurisdictions that ban unlicensed firearm production.

Deterrence Dispensed has moved towards alternative social networks and platforms because of suspensions from several mainstream networks. The group maintained an active presence on Twitter and YouTube until both platforms banned them in May 2019. The day after the YouTube ban, Deterrence Dispensed instead began sharing their videos on GunStreamer, which is a video sharing site dedicated to firearms topics. Additionally, Reddit banned a subreddit focused around the group in July of that same year. After the Reddit ban, Deterrence Dispensed migrated to Tumblr and Keybase. But, Tumblr shut down their account the following month.In the two weeks after Deterrence Dispensed joined Keybase they became the sixth most popular team on the platform. However, in January 2021 they would be kicked off of Keybase as well, which was attributed to policy changes after Keybase's acquisition by Zoom Video Communications. In 2019, the group also began sharing its blueprints on spee.ch, a now-defunct file-sharing website built by the LBRY team; the site was later replaced by LBRY.tv. The group has also used Signal, Discord, and Internet Relay Chat (IRC).

The majority of these files are now hosted on thegatalog.com, although the files themselves are hosted on Odysee which, like spee.ch, was built by the LBRY team.

Designs 
Deterrence Dispensed is best known for developing and releasing the FGC-9, a 3D printed carbine requiring no regulated parts. The group also distributes blueprints for AR-15s, an AKM receiver called the "Plastikov", handgun frames, and a magazine for Glock pistols. The group named the Glock magazine design the "Menendez mag" after New Jersey Senator Bob Menendez, who has pushed for crackdowns on the online sharing of 3D printed firearms designs. In 2019 the group released a design called the "Yankee Boogle", which is an auto sear that converts a semi-automatic AR-15 into a fully automatic one. The name is a possible reference to the Boogaloo movement.

See also 
 Gun control
 Improvised firearm
 Liberator (gun)
 List of notable 3D printed weapons and parts
 Right to keep and bear arms
 Crypto-anarchism

References

External links 
 

3D printed firearms
Free and open-source software organizations
Online organizations
Weapon development